Arun Sharma (born 17 September 1973) is an Indian first-class cricketer who played for Services and Jammu & Kashmir. He coached at Sehwag Cricket Academy in Jammu.

References

External links
 

1973 births
Living people
Indian cricketers
Services cricketers
Jammu and Kashmir cricketers
People from Jammu
Indian cricket coaches